Trex Company, Inc. is a manufacturer of wood-alternative composite decking, railing, and other outdoor items made from recycled materials. Headquartered in Winchester, Virginia, Trex is world's largest manufacturer of wood-alternative decking and railing. Trex composite products are made of 95% recycled materials. In redirecting more than 400 million pounds of plastic and scrap wood from landfills each year, Trex is one of the largest plastic film recyclers in the US.

Company history 
In 1988, Roger Wittenberg combined sawdust and plastic bags to create a park bench. In 1996, Mobil Chemical Co. acquired Wittenberg's technology and formed Trex, LLC. Trex is widely considered to be one of the inventors of composite decking made from recyclable materials. The idea for a process and product created to maximize the use of materials that would otherwise wind up in landfills is credited to inventors Kjell-Ake Gustafsson, of Binghamton, New York; John J. Muller, of Winchester, Virginia; and Roger A. Wittenberg of Newton, Pennsylvania. The first patent for a “Method of Producing a Wood-Thermoplastic Composite Material” was filed as U.S. Patent number 5746958 in March 1995 and granted in May 1998.

Leadership 
Bryan H. Fairbanks was named president and CEO of Trex effective April 29, 2020. Former president and CEO (2015-2020), James E. Cline, has assumed the position of chairman of the board. Dennis C. Schemm was named vice president and CFO and Ronald W. Kaplan is now vice chairman effective April 29, 2020.

Manufacturing 

Trex is America's largest manufacturer of composite decking. Their manufacturing process combines recycled plastic film, like grocery bags and dry cleaning wrap, with reclaimed wood, some of which is swept from the floors of furniture factories. To procure the amount of plastic film necessary for production, Trex leans on partnerships with grocery store chains like Albertsons, which has contributed more than 200 million pounds of recycled plastic film to the NexTrex® recycling program. Trex uses approximately 400 million pounds of recycled plastic film to make its composite decking. Trex maintains two manufacturing facilities in Winchester, Virginia, and Fernley, Nevada.

Environmental considerations
Trex promotes an environmental stance as part of its commercial appeal in the marketplace.

Recycled components

Trex composite decking contains more than 95% recycled content and offers verification by ICC-ES. In July 2010 Trex received a Verification of Attributes Report (VAR-1011) from the International Code Council Evaluation Service (ICC-ES) under the Sustainable Attributes Verification and Evaluation Program. The verification validates Trex's wood-alternative products are manufactured with a minimum of 95.4% recycled content. Trex claims is the first composite decking manufacturer to obtain this certification.

Environmental recognition

Trex corporate participation in environmental efforts, coupled with its eco-friendly product profile, has led to recognition by governments, publications and trade groups.

These include:

 Winner, “Greenest Decking,” 2019, Green Builder Media.
Eco Leader Award, 2019, Green Builder Media.
Readers' Choice Award, 2015 & 2016, Green Builder magazine.
Winner, 2016 GAIA award.

Industry recognition

America's Best Mid-Sized Companies, 2021, Forbes.
Top Brand, 2017 & 2019 Builder Brand Use Study.
Best of Houzz Design Award, 2017, Houzz.com.
Top Brand: all four composite/PVC subcategories, 2016, Builder Brand Use Study.
Gold Award, Social Media Communications, 2016, Publicity Club of Chicago.
Best of Houzz Design Award, 2016, Houzz.com.
 Platinum (x3), Gold (x3) Awards for Design Excellence, 2015, ADEX.
 Best Decking (Platinum List), 2015, Ocean Home Magazine.
 Eight awards, 2015, Remodeling Magazine's Brand Use Study.

Product issues
A manufacturing problem at the Trex manufacturing facility in Fernley, Nevada from 2002 to 2007 led to production of decking boards that were prone to surface flaking. These boards were sold throughout 16 Western states in the U.S. and resulted in a class-action suit against the company. In a settlement approved in 2010, Trex agreed to replace any decking boards, including some resulting labor costs, for decking affected by surface flaking.

References

 “Pool Decks”. Professional pool Deck builder. Retrieved 19 March 2005.

External links
 

Home improvement companies
Recycled building materials
Building materials companies of the United States
Companies listed on the New York Stock Exchange